INS Kesari was a  of the Indian Navy.

History
Built at the Gdańsk Shipyard in Poland, INS Kesari was commissioned on 15 August 1975. She was decommissioned on 8 May 1999.

See also
 Ships of the Indian Navy

References

Kumbhir-class tank landing ships
1975 ships
Ships built in Gdańsk
Naval ships built in Poland for export